Mirror is the fourth album by Graham Central Station, released in 1976. The album peaked at number seven on the Billboard Top Soul Albums chart.

Track listing 
All songs written by Larry Graham.
"Entrow" - 7:09 	
"Love (Covers a Multitude of Sin)" - 3:49 	
"Mirror" - 3:50 	
"Do Yah" - 3:55 	
"Save Me" - 5:17 	
"I Got a Reason" - 3:48 	
"Priscilla" - 3:15 	
"Forever" - 6:54

Personnel 
Larry Graham - bass guitar, synthesizer, lead and backing vocals
Hershall "Happiness" Kennedy - clavinet, vocals
Gaylord "Flash" Birch - drums, vocals
David "Dynamite" Vega - guitar, vocals
Robert "Butch" Sam - organ, piano, vocals
Patryce "Choc'Let" Banks - drum programming (Funk Box), percussion, vocals

Charts

References

External links
 Graham Central Station - Mirror at Discogs

1976 albums
Graham Central Station albums
Warner Records albums
Albums recorded at Wally Heider Studios